Janelle Brown is an American novelist. She is the author of I'll Be You (2022), Pretty Things (2020), Watch Me Disappear (2017), This Is Where We Live (2010) and All We Ever Wanted Was Everything (2008), three of which were New York Times best sellers. Pretty Things is currently being adapted as a television series reported to include actress Nicole Kidman, and was picked as one of the best books of 2020 by Amazon.

A former journalist, Brown worked as a senior writer at Salon.com from 1998 - 2002, writing about technology and culture, and was considered an influential early chronicle of the digital music industry. From 1995 - 1998, she worked at Wired, helping launch Wired News, and was named one of the Top 25 Women on the Web. She was also the co-founder of Maxi, an influential early online feminist zine. Her writing has appeared in many publications including The New York Times, Psychology Today, andVogue.

She grew up in the San Francisco Bay Area, studied English at the University of California, Berkeley, and resides in Los Angeles with her husband, director Greg Harrison.

References

External links 

 www.janellebrown.com

American writers
Year of birth missing (living people)
Living people
University of California, Berkeley alumni